Gnorimoschema mikkolai is a moth in the family Gelechiidae. It was described by Povolný in 1994. It is found in Russia, where it has been recorded from the Magadan Oblast in north-eastern Siberia.

References

Gnorimoschema
Moths described in 1994